The 2021–22 season was Dinamo București's 73rd year in their history, all of them played in the top-flight of Romanian football. Along with the league, the club also competed in the Cupa României. The season covered the period from 15 June 2021 to 1 June 2022.

On 29 May 2022, the club's relegation to the second division was confirmed after 74 years in the top tier.

Pre-season friendlies
Dinamo announced they would play friendly matches against Galatasaray and Ankara Keçiörengücü as part of the pre-season preparations.

Competitions

Liga I

Regular season

League table

Results summary

Results by matchday

Matches

July

August

September

October

November

December

January

February

March

Play-out

Table

Results summary

Results by matchday

Matches

March

April

May

Promotion/relegation play-off

Cupa României

Statistics

Appearances and goals

|-
|colspan="12"|Players sold, released or loaned out during the season:

|}

Disciplinary record

Transfers

Transfers in

Loans in

Loans out

Transfers out

Released

References

Dinamo, București, FC
FC Dinamo București seasons